Tim Watts is a British short filmmaker and animator, best known for his work on The Big Story. He is also known for his caricature work on TV's Spitting Image.

Accolades
Watts won the BAFTA award with longtime collaborator, David Stoten in 1994 for The Big Story.

In addition, he was nominated for an Academy Award for The Big Story at the 67th Academy Awards.

References

External links

Living people
Spitting Image
British film directors
BAFTA winners (people)
Place of birth missing (living people)
1965 births